Brian Daniels (born October 31, 1984) is a former American football guard who last played for the Minnesota Vikings of the National Football League. He was signed by the Vikings as an undrafted free agent in 2007. He played college football at Colorado.

He is currently a member of the Glendale Raptors rugby squad in Glendale, Colorado.

External links
Colorado Buffaloes bio
Minnesota Vikings bio

1984 births
Living people
Players of American football from Denver
American football offensive guards
Colorado Buffaloes football players
Minnesota Vikings players